Andrei Andreyevich Vasilevskiy (born 25 July 1994) is a Russian professional ice hockey goaltender for the Tampa Bay Lightning of the National Hockey League (NHL). He was drafted in the first round, 19th overall, by the Lightning at the 2012 NHL Entry Draft.

Nicknamed the "Big Cat" and "Vasy", he won the Vezina Trophy as the league's top goaltender in the 2018–19 season, and has led the league in wins for five consecutive seasons (2017–18 to 2021–22). He also backstopped the Lightning to back-to-back Stanley Cup championships in 2020 and 2021, winning the Conn Smythe Trophy as the most valuable player in the 2021 playoffs while also holding the NHL record for most wins in single postseason (18 in 2020).

Playing career

Junior
He was originally selected by Salavat Yulaev Ufa in the first round, seventh overall, of the 2011 KHL Junior Draft.

Vasilevskiy was selected 19th overall in the 2012 NHL Entry Draft by the Tampa Bay Lightning. On 6 May 2014, he was signed by the Lightning to a three-year, entry-level contract.

Professional

Early years in Tampa Bay (2014–2017)
On 27 September 2014, Vasilevskiy was assigned to the Syracuse Crunch of the American Hockey League (AHL), the top minor league affiliate of the Tampa Bay Lightning. On 15 December 2014, Vasilevskiy was named the CCM/AHL Player of the Week. In the previous week, he allowed just one goal on 56 shots faced in two games, which was good for a 0.50 goals against average (GAA) and a .982 save percentage. Vasilevskiy had a 29-save shutout against the Springfield Falcons, which snapped their franchise-record 11-game winning streak. In the next game, he made 29 saves in a 4–1 victory over the Hershey Bears. Vasilevskiy had compiled a record of 8–3–3 in 14 appearances with Syracuse that season, with a 2.34 GAA, .918 save percentage and two shutouts. On 2 January 2015, he was named CCM/AHL Goaltender of the Month for December, posting a 4–0–1 record with a 1.17 GAA and a .962 save percentage. He was the first Syracuse goaltender to win the award since Karl Goehring was honored in March 2008.

On 16 December 2014, Vasilevskiy was recalled to the Tampa Bay Lightning. He then started that night in his NHL debut, a 3–1 victory over the Philadelphia Flyers. He also accomplished another feat that night by becoming the first NHL goaltender to ever wear the number 88. He recorded his first NHL shutout on 3 March 2015, over the Buffalo Sabres in a 28-save performance. Vasilevskiy's first playoff win came on 6 June 2015, when he replaced starting goaltender Ben Bishop twice during the third period of Game 2 of the Finals; he thus became the first goalie in 24 years to win a playoff Final in relief and the first to earn his first career playoff win in relief in the Final since Lester Patrick in 1928.

On 3 September 2015, Vasilevskiy had successful surgery to remove a blood clot from near his left collarbone and to treat a type of Vascular Thoracic Outlet Syndrome. Vasilevskiy was expected to return to the ice in 2–3 months. On 21 October 2015, Vasilevskiy was cleared to come off of his blood thinner medication, allowing him to return to practice. On 1 November 2015, the Lightning recalled Vasilevskiy from his conditioning stint with the Crunch, where he made 56 of 58 saves in two wins. Vasilevskiy made his return to the NHL that same night, in a 4–3 Lightning victory over the Carolina Hurricanes.

On 1 July 2016, the Lightning announced the re-signing of Vasilevskiy to a three-year contract extension. Vasilevskiy appeared in 24 games with the team during the 2015–16 season, posting a record of 11–10–0 to go along with a 2.76 goals-against average and .910 save percentage, as well as one shutout in his second season. He also played in eight Stanley Cup playoff games in 2016, recording a record of 3–4 to go along with a 2.76 goals-against average and .925 save percentage. On 28 December 2016, Vasilevskiy recorded his first career NHL point as an assist on an overtime goal scored by Tyler Johnson, which came in a 4–3 victory over the Montreal Canadiens.

Emergence, Vezina Trophy, back-to-back Stanley Cup wins (2017–present)
On 26 October 2017, Vasilevskiy played in his 100th career NHL game. In that game Vasilevskiy recorded his 8th consecutive win of the season. This win tied Vasilevskiy with Nikolai Khabibulin for most consecutive wins by a Lightning goaltender. On 30 October 2017, Vasilevskiy recorded his 9th consecutive win, which moved him past Khabibulin for most consecutive wins by a Lightning goalie. This was Vasilevskiy's 10th win of the month of October, which tied him with Manny Legace and Craig Anderson for the most wins in a single season in the month of October in NHL history. On 12 December 2017, Vasilevskiy recorded a 3–0 shutout against the St. Louis Blues at the Scottrade Center. The win was Vasilevskiy's 20th of the season over 25-games, which was the 5th fastest in NHL history. This also made Vasilevskiy only the 6th goalie in NHL history to record 20 wins in 25 games played.

On 10 January 2018, Vasilevskiy was named to the 2018 NHL All-Star Game. This was Vasilevskiy's first selection to an NHL All-Star game in his career. On 22 January 2018, Vasilevskiy recorded a shutout in a 2–0 win over the Chicago Blackhawks at the United Center. The shutout was Vasilevskiy's 7th of the season, which tied him with Nikolai Khabibulin for the most shutouts in a single season by a Lightning goalie. Additionally, Vasilevskiy set the franchise record for most road shutouts in a single season with his 6th of the season. On 27 February 2018, Vasilevskiy recorded his 78th career NHL win. The win moved Vasilevskiy past Daren Puppa for 3rd most wins in Lightning history. On 20 March 2018, Vasilevskiy recorded his 41st win of the season. The win moved Vasilevskiy past Ben Bishop for the most wins in a single season in Lightning history. On 3 April 2018, Vasilevskiy recorded his 43rd win of the season in a 4–0 shutout of the visiting Boston Bruins. The win moved Vasilevskiy past Nikolai Khabibulin for 2nd most wins in franchise history (84). Vasilevskiy's 8th shutout of the season gave him sole possession for the most shutouts in a single season by a Lightning goaltender. On 17 April 2018, Vasilevskiy was nominated for the Vezina Trophy, which is given out annually to the top goaltender in the NHL.

On 14 November 2018, Vasilevskiy suffered an injury while in practice. Two days later, it was announced that he would be sidelined for four to six weeks with a fractured left foot. Vasilevskiy returned 4 weeks later and started his first game back on 13 December, in a home game against the Toronto Maple Leafs. In that game he tied the Lightning team record for most saves in a game with 48 saves, tying a record Ben Bishop set in 2014 and helping the Lightning win 4–1. On 8 January 2019, Vasilevskiy was added to the Atlantic Division roster for the 2019 National Hockey League All-Star Game as a replacement for an injured Carey Price. On 15 January 2019, Vasilevskiy recorded a shutout in a 2–0 Lightning win over the Dallas Stars at American Airlines Center. The shutout moved Vasilevskiy past Nikolai Khabibulin (14) for 2nd most shutouts in franchise history (15). On 14 February 2019, Vasilevskiy recorded a shutout in a 6–0 Lightning victory over the Dallas Stars to move him into a tie with Ben Bishop (17) for most shutouts in Lightning history. On 16 February 2019, Vasilevskiy recorded a shutout in consecutive games to give him the franchise record for shutouts (18). On 20 March 2019, Vasilevskiy recorded 54 saves in a 5-4 OT win over the Washington Capitals at Capital One Arena to set the Lightning record for the most saves in a game. In a 13-save victory over the Boston Bruins on 25 March 2019, Vasilevskiy moved past Ben Bishop for the most saves in franchise history (5739). On 1 April 2019, Vasilevskiy started in his 207th career NHL game to pass Daren Puppa (206) for 2nd most starts in franchise history. On 19 June 2019, at the 2019 NHL Awards, Vasilevskiy was awarded the Vezina Trophy as the top goaltender in the league. He was the first player in franchise history to win the award.

On 29 July 2019, Vasilevskiy signed an eight-year, $76 million contract extension to remain with the Lightning through the 2027–28 season. On 11 August 2020, he made 61 saves in a five overtime victory over the Columbus Blue Jackets in the opening game of the first round of the playoffs. The 61-save effort was the most saves in a single playoff game in Lightning history. On 25 August 2020, Vasilevskiy recorded an overtime victory over the Boston Bruins in the second game of their second round series. The win moved Vasilevskiy past Ben Bishop and Nikolai Khabibulin for the most playoff wins (22) in Lightning playoff history. On 28 September 2020, Vasilevskiy recorded his first career playoff shutout in the Lightning's Stanley Cup clinching win over the Dallas Stars in game 6 of the 2020 Stanley Cup Finals. With the shutout, Vasilevskiy joined Tom Barrasso as the only goaltenders in NHL history to record their first shutout in a playoff year during the Stanley Cup clinching game. He also set an NHL record for the most minutes played by a goaltender in the postseason (1,708:12) and the most postseason wins in a single season (18). Vasilevskiy continued his stellar play during the 2020-2021 season and helped lead the Lightning to the Stanley Cup Playoffs. In each of the series clinching games, Vasilevskiy earned a shut out. On 7 July 2021, Vasilevskiy posted a shutout against the Montreal Canadiens and the Lightning won the Stanley Cup back to back years. Vasilevskiy posted shutouts in all four of the Lightning series winning games, extending his streak to 5 consecutive series clinching shutouts, tying an NHL record with Chris Osgood and Clint Benedict. On 23 May 2022, Vasilevskiy posted his NHL record breaking sixth series clinching shutout with a 49 save shutout against the Florida Panthers in a 4-game sweep and finished the series with a .981 save percentage, allowing 3 goals over 154 shots.

International play

In winning the 2014 IIHF World Championship with the Russian senior team, Vasilevskiy was awarded the Order of Honour on 27 May 2014.

On 2 March 2016, the Russian Ice Hockey Federation named Vasilevskiy to its roster for the 2016 World Cup of Hockey. Vasilevskiy was joined by Lightning teammates Vladislav Namestnikov, and Nikita Kucherov. The tournament took place from 17 Sep to 1 October 2016, in Toronto.

On 9 April 2017, the Russian Ice Hockey Federation named Vasilevskiy to its roster for the 2017 World Ice Hockey Championships. Vasilevskiy was joined by teammate Nikita Kucherov. On 21 May 2017, Vasilevskiy helped Russia capture a bronze medal when they defeated Finland in the bronze medal game. Additionally, Vasilevskiy was voted the top goaltender of the tournament.

Personal life
His father, Andrei Vasilevski (born 1966), was also a goaltender who competed in the Russian Superleague as a member of Salavat Yulaev Ufa. Vasilevskiy is married to his wife Ksenia and they have a son named Lukas.

Career statistics

Regular season and playoffs
Bold indicates led league

International

Awards and honors

Records

Single season
 Most wins in a single season by a Tampa Bay Lightning goaltender – 44 (2017–18)
 Most shutouts in a single season by a Tampa Bay Lightning goaltender – 8 (2017–18)
 Most saves in a single season by a Tampa Bay Lightning goaltender – 1,908 (2017–18)
 Most shots against in a single season by a Tampa Bay Lightning goaltender – 2,075 (2017–18)

Career regular season
 Most wins by a Tampa Bay Lightning goaltender – 254
 Most shutouts by a Tampa Bay Lightning goaltender – 29
 Most games played by a Tampa Bay Lightning goaltender – 404
 Most career saves by a Tampa Bay Lightning goaltender – 11,261
 Most shots against by a Tampa Bay Lightning goaltender – 12,251
 Most saves in a game by a Tampa Bay Lightning goaltender – 54

Career playoffs
 NHL record most wins in a single postseason – 18 (2020)
 Most playoff wins by a Tampa Bay Lightning goaltender – 33
 Most playoff games played by a Tampa Bay Lightning goaltender – 58
 Most saves in a playoff game by a Tampa Bay Lightning goaltender – 61
 Most series clinching shutouts in NHL history - 6

References

External links
 
 Minor Hockey League profile

1994 births
Living people
Conn Smythe Trophy winners
National Hockey League All-Stars
National Hockey League first-round draft picks
People from Tyumen
Russian expatriate ice hockey people
Russian expatriate sportspeople in the United States
Russian ice hockey goaltenders
Salavat Yulaev Ufa players
Stanley Cup champions
Syracuse Crunch players
Tampa Bay Lightning draft picks
Tampa Bay Lightning players
Tolpar Ufa players
Vezina Trophy winners
Sportspeople from Tyumen Oblast